Nirbaskhola Union, is a union parishad of the Jessore District in the Division of Khulna, Bangladesh. It has an area of 20.82 square kilometres and a population of 13,526.

References

Unions of Jhikargacha Upazila
Unions of Jessore District
Unions of Khulna Division